Umar Patek (born 1970) is an Indonesian convicted terrorist and member of Jemaah Islamiyah who was wanted in the United States, Australia, and Indonesia on terrorism charges. There was a US$1 million reward offered by the Rewards For Justice Program for information leading to his capture. 

In June 2012, Patek was convicted for his involvement in the 2002 bombings in Bali, Indonesia, which killed 202 people, and injured 209 others. On December 7th, 2022, Patek was released from prison.

Capture and trial 
Patek was captured by Pakistani security officials in Abbotabad on 25 January 2011 after a decade-long manhunt. Indonesian officials reported that Patek had confessed to playing a key role in the 2002 Bali bombings as well as a series of bombings on Christmas Eve in 2000. Ansyaad Mbai, the head of Indonesia's anti-terrorism agency, also told the Associated Press that Patek had "helped lead authorities to bin Laden." In May 2011, Indonesian Defense Minister Purnomo Yusgiantoro said that Patek was in Abottabad with his wife with the purpose of meeting bin Laden, but an unnamed U.S. counterterrorism official dismissed this claim as a "coincidence" and told ABC News that the U.S. had no evidence that Patek was attempting to meet with the al-Qaeda leader Dawn.com earlier reported that Patek intended to travel to North Waziristan with two French militants.

There had been earlier false reports that he had been killed on 14 September 2006, in the Sulu province of the Philippines.

On 11 August 2011, Umar Patek was extradited from Pakistan to Indonesia where he was detained in Jakarta before a pending trial.

On 21 June 2012, an Indonesian court sentenced Patek to 20 years in prison for murder and bomb-making. He was found guilty of all six charges, which included involvement in attacks against churches on Christmas Eve 2000. Prosecutors did not seek the death penalty. During the trial, Patek apologized to families of victims and maintained that he did nothing more than mix chemicals for the explosives. Patek also stated that his target had always been Israelis and not "Westerners". He stated, "I questioned why in Bali? Jihad should be carried out in Palestine instead... Who were the victims, they were Westerners, they weren’t Israelis. In fact many Indonesians were
victims. They had no link to Palestine."

Patek was granted an early release in August 2022 as part of Indonesia’s Independence Day celebrations, causing much anger in Australia; he only served 10 years of his 20-year service, released early for "good behaviour". The actual release date has not been confirmed, but Indonesian authorities claim he has been deradicalized. An Australian survivor who helped rescue injured people from the blast zone, Erik de Haart, vented his outrage on the Australian TV show Sunrise, comparing the execution of the Bali Nine perpetrators (who did not kill anyone) with Patek, who killed hundreds of innocent victims and devastated thousands of close friends and family by extension.

De Haart said, “This guy’s responsible for the death of over 200 people, and he gets released early because he was a good boy in jail? Please. Anyone can pretend to be de-radicalised—but, at the end of the day, he made a weapon that killed 202 people, including 88 Australians. And, you know, 10 years? Is that enough? ... He doesn't deserve to be given a good-behaviour release".

De Haart also suggested Australia take a harder line on Indonesia, who had recently offered Indonesia a billion-dollar loan due to the COVID-19 pandemic.

See also
2002 Bali bombings

References

External links
Dawn Archive
Official: CIA tipoff led to Pakistan arrest, Kathy Gannon and Kimberly Dozier, Boston Globe, 30 March 2011
Joint Team Will Fly to Pakistan to Verify Umar Patek's Arrest, Made Arya Kencana, Jakarta Globe, 30 March 2011

Jemaah Islamiyah
1970 births
Indonesian Islamists
Muslims with branch missing
Living people
Javanese people
Place of birth missing (living people)
People imprisoned on charges of terrorism
People convicted of murder by Indonesia
Indonesian people convicted of murder
People extradited from Pakistan
People extradited to Indonesia
Indonesian expatriates in Pakistan
2002 Bali bombings